A special health authority is a type of NHS body which provide services on behalf of the National Health Service in England.  Unlike other types of trust, they operate nationally rather than serve a specific geographical area.

They are a type of "arm's length body" of the Department of Health of the United Kingdom, along with executive agencies and non-departmental public bodies (NDPBs).  Special health authorities are independent, but can be subject to ministerial direction like other NHS bodies.

Function
While special health authorities may provide services direct to the public, most are concerned with improving the ability of other parts of the NHS to deliver effective health care.

Establishment
Special health authorities were set to provide a national service to the NHS or the public, under section 11 of the National Health Service Act 1977.  Prior to the repeal of the whole of the 1977 Act by the NHS (Consequential Provisions) Act 2006, special health authorities included both infrastructure support organisations and national/specialist treatment providers such as the Special Hospitals Service Authority and the Bethlem Royal and Maudsley Special Health Authority.  These direct clinical service providers were progressively merged with local NHS trusts and consequently with mainstream governance and funding arrangements.

The support special health authorities are now provided for under section 28 of the National Health Service Act 2006.

NHS special health authorities
 NHS Blood and Transplant
 NHS Business Services Authority
 NHS Litigation Authority
 NHS Counter Fraud Authority, established 1 November 2017

Former NHS special health authorities
 NHS Trust Development Authority until April 2016; became part of NHS Improvement
 Bethlem Royal and Maudsley Special Health Authority
 Health Education England until April 2015; became non-departmental public body
 Health Protection Agency until April 2005; became non-departmental public body
 Health Research Authority until January 2015; became non-departmental public body
 Information Centre for Health and Social Care until April 2013; became non-departmental public body
 Mental Health Act Commission until March 2009; succeeded by the Care Quality Commission
 National Institute for Health and Clinical Excellence until April 2013; became non-departmental public body
 National Patient Safety Agency until June 2012
 National Treatment Agency for Substance Misuse until April 2013; became part of Public Health England
 NHS Appointments Commission until October 2012
 NHS Counter Fraud and Security Management Service
 NHS Dental Vocational Training Authority until April 2006; succeeded by the Committee of Postgraduate Deans and Directors
 NHS Direct until April 2008; converted to an NHS trust
 NHS Information Authority until April 2005
 NHS Institute for Innovation and Improvement until April 2013
 NHS Logistics until October 2006; joined forces with DHL to become NHS Supply Chain
 NHS Pensions Agency
 NHS Professionals Special Health Authority until April 2010; became government-owned company NHS Professionals
 Prescription Pricing Authority
 Special Hospitals Service Authority

Notes

References

National Health Service (England)
Department of Health and Social Care